Ibrahim Abdelhalim Masoud (Arabic:إبراهيم عبدالحليم مسعود) (born 25 November 1997) is a footballer. He currently plays for Al-Rayyan.

References

External links
 

1997 births
Living people
Al-Rayyan SC players
Qatari footballers
Qatar Stars League players
Association football midfielders